Ménamba I is a village and rural commune in the Cercle of Yorosso in the Sikasso Region of southern Mali. The commune covers an area of 328 square kilometers and includes 8 villages. In the 2009 census it had a population of 10,449. The village of Ménamba I, the administrative center (chef-lieu) of the commune, is 12 km east-northeast of Yorosso.

References

External links
.

Communes of Sikasso Region